Urban Affairs Review is a peer-reviewed academic journal that covers the field of urban studies, including urban policy, urban economic development and residential and community development. The journal's editors-in-chief are Phil Ashton (University of Illinois at Chicago), Peter Burns (Soka University of America), Jered Carr (University of Illinois at Chicago), Joshua Drucker (University of Illinois at Chicago), and Yue Zhang (University of Illinois at Chicago). Jered B. Carr (University of Illinois at Chicago) serves as Managing Editor. It was established in 1965 as Urban Affairs Quarterly and obtained its current title in 1996. It is currently published by SAGE Publications in association with the Urban Politics Section of the American Political Science Association.

In March 2016, Urban Affairs Review launched its new blog/website, The Urban Affairs Forum.  The Urban Affairs Forum is a space for leading thinkers about urban issues to share their research, ideas, and experiences. The website is hosted by the College of Urban Planning and Public Affairs (CUPPA) at the University of Illinois at Chicago.

Abstracting and indexing 
Urban Affairs Review is abstracted and indexed in Scopus and the Social Sciences Citation Index. According to the Journal Citation Reports, its 2019 impact factor is 2.192, ranking it 22 out of 42 journals in the category "Urban Studies".

Editors-in-Chief of the Urban Affairs Review 1965-Present 
Marilyn J. Gittell (1965-1970)

Peter Bouxsein (1970-1973)

Louis H. Masotti (1974-1980)

Albert Hunter and Robert L. Lineberry (1980-1981)

Margaret T. Gordon, Albert Hunter and Robert L. Lineberry (1981-1982)

Margaret T. Gordon and Albert Hunter (1982-1984)

Albert Hunter (1984-1985)

Dennis R. Judd and Donald Phares (1985-1992)

Dennis R. Judd (1992-2002)

Susan E. Clarke, Gary L. Gaile and Michael A. Pagano (2002-2009)

Susan E. Clarke and Michael A. Pagano (2009-2013)

Peter Burns, Jered B. Carr, Annette Steinacker, Jill Tao, and Antonio Tavares (2014-2019)

Phil Ashton, Peter Burns, Jered B. Carr, Joshua Drucker, and Yue Zhang (2020-Present)

References

External links
 
 Urban Affairs Review Forum (blog)

SAGE Publishing academic journals
English-language journals
Urban studies and planning journals